Threapland may refer to:
 Threapland, Cumbria, England
 Threapland, North Yorkshire, England